Harmonic generation (HG, also called multiple harmonic generation) is a nonlinear optical process in which  photons with the same frequency interact with a nonlinear material, are "combined", and generate a new photon with  times the energy of the initial photons (equivalently,  times the frequency and the wavelength divided by ).

General process

In a medium having a substantial nonlinear susceptibility, harmonic generation is possible. Note that for even orders, the medium must have no center of symmetry (non-centrosymmetrical).

Because the process requires that many photons are present at the same time and at the same place, the generation process has a low probability to occur, and this probability decreases with the order . To generate efficiently, the symmetry of the medium must allow the signal to be amplified (through phase matching, for instance), and the light source must be intense and well-controlled spatially (with a collimated laser) and temporally (more signal if the laser has short pulses).

Sum-frequency generation (SFG) 

Second-harmonic generation (SHG) 

Also a special case of sum-frequency generation in which both photons are at the same frequency .

Third-harmonic generation (THG) 

If they have different frequency, the general term of four-wave mixing is preferred. This process involves the 3rd order nonlinear susceptibility .

Unlike SHG, it is a volumetric process and has been shown in liquids. However, it is enhanced at interfaces.

Materials used for THG 

Nonlinear crystals such as BBO (β-BaB2O4) or LBO can convert THG, otherwise THG can be generated from membranes in microscopy.

Fourth-harmonic generation (FHG or 4HG) 

Reported around the year 2000, powerful lasers now enable efficient FHG. This process involves the 4th order nonlinear susceptibility .

Materials used for FHG 
Some BBO (β-BaB2O4) are used for FHG.

Harmonic generation for  

To generate high harmonics (like  and so on), the substantially different process of high harmonic generation can be used.

Sources

See also
Nonlinear optics
Second-harmonic generation
High harmonic generation
Optical frequency multiplier

References

Nonlinear optics